Fremont Older (August 30, 1856 – March 3, 1935) was a newspaperman and editor in San Francisco, California for nearly 50 years. He is best known for his campaigns against civic corruption, capital punishment, prison reform, and efforts on behalf of Tom Mooney and Warren Billings, wrongly convicted of the Preparedness Day bombing of 1916.

Career 

Born in a log house in Appleton, Wisconsin, Older began working at age 12 circa 1868 as an apprentice printer. He claimed that this was after reading the story of Horace Greeley. He worked in Virginia City, Nevada, on the Enterprise, then moved on to the Redwood City Journal, later writing for the Alta California.

In 1895, Older became managing editor of the San Francisco Bulletin (later merged with the San Francisco Call in 1929). He gained notoriety when he took on the Boss Abe Ruef machine in San Francisco, during the mayoralty of Eugene Schmitz. This led to the corruption trials during the rebuilding of San Francisco following the 1906 earthquake and fire.  On September 27, 1907, Older was kidnapped and threatened with murder by private detective Luther Brown, said to be working for the grafters.

In his later years at the Bulletin, Older was offended by the owner's rewriting of his editorials and refusal to commit to a lifelong appointment. Hence, after 23 years of service, he resigned in 1918 and went to William Randolph Hearst's paper, the San Francisco Call. Along with talented staff, he brought the Mooney case and numerous other stories that the Bulletin owner had refused to carry, including the James Graham Fair will case involving former state Supreme court justice Frederick W. Henshaw and a bribe amounting to $400,000.

Older originally believed Mooney was guilty, but changed his mind and spent 20 years working for the release of Mooney and Billings. Although it was reported that he disliked Mooney, thinking him worthy of jail for real crimes, but not for the bombing at Steuart and Market for which he was jailed. For his efforts, Older was called a communist, a Wobblie, a syndicalist and traitor, but Hearst backed him. Older died a few years before Mooney was pardoned by California Governor Culbert Olson in 1939.

Older was also an early defender of prostitutes, having published a story at the Bulletin in 1917 entitled "A Voice from the Underworld, by Alice Smith." The article also increased the circulation of the Bulletin.

Older was married to Cora Baggerly, herself well-known as "a noted Californian historian and writer." He was also a long-time friend and correspondent of Clarence Darrow and was known as a friend to the poor. He regularly tried to reform drunkards and criminals with mixed success. After 20 years of attempting to help such persons, Older said, "I'm sorry, but I must admit that of the scores I have helped, all but one or two have failed me."

Older died at a hospital in Stockton, California after suffering a heart attack while driving.

Legacy
The World War II Liberty ship, the S.S. Fremont Older, was named for Older.
The Fremont Older Open Space Preserve incorporates his home and estate in the hills above Cupertino, California.
The Fremont Older Elementary School, Cupertino, California was also named for Older.

References

Resources
 Gaudy Century, the story of San Francisco's hundred years of robust journalism - John Bruce - Random House N.Y. 1948
 My Own Story - Fremont Older - The Call Publishing Co, San Francisco 1919 - Focuses on the San Francisco newspaper and political scene 1895-1917.
 Fremont Older & the 1916 San Francisco Bombing. A Tireless Crusade for Justice - John C. Ralston. The History Press, Charleston, S.C., 2013. About Older's crusade to free two men wrongly convicted of a terrorist bombing.

External links

Short radio episode Mercy, from My Own Story, 1919. California Legacy Project.
Biography of Fremont Older
Guide to the Fremont Older Papers at The Bancroft Library

Writers from Appleton, Wisconsin
1856 births
1935 deaths
Writers from San Francisco
19th-century American newspaper editors
Journalists from Wisconsin
20th-century American newspaper editors
Editors of California newspapers
19th-century American male writers
20th-century American male writers
American male journalists
American anti-corruption activists